Royal Berkshire Fire and Rescue Service (RBFRS) is a statutory fire and rescue service covering the area of the ceremonial county of Berkshire in England. The fire service was formerly administered by Berkshire County Council, but when that was abolished the service became the responsibility of the Royal Berkshire Fire Authority, made up of representatives from the six unitary authorities of Bracknell Forest Borough Council, Reading Borough Council, Royal Borough of Windsor and Maidenhead, Slough Borough Council, West Berkshire Council, and Wokingham Borough Council.

RBFRS headquarters is located at Newsham Court, Pincents Kiln, in the Reading suburb of Calcot. It operates from 16 fire stations across Berkshire.

Performance
In 2018/2019, every fire and rescue service in England and Wales was subjected to a statutory inspection by His Majesty's Inspectorate of Constabulary and Fire & Rescue Services (HIMCFRS). The inspection investigated how well the service performs in each of three areas. On a scale of outstanding, good, requires improvement and inadequate, Royal Berkshire Fire and Rescue Service was rated as follows:

Fire stations and appliances 
The service operates 16 fire stations  12 of which are crewed by wholetime firefighters and four use retained firefighters.

The community fire station at Theale, which opened in 2021, is also a base for South Central Ambulance Service and Thames Valley Police. It replaced the former Dee Road (Reading) and Pangbourne fire stations.

Wokingham Road fire station in Reading is also home to the Red Cross Fire Emergency Support Service, who have their own specialist vehicle at the station.
The Red Cross team are mobilised by RBFRS control staff to respond to people affected by incidents such as fire or flood.
Established in Berkshire in 1993, they can provide food, clothing, and arrange emergency accommodation.

See also
Fire service in the United Kingdom
List of British firefighters killed in the line of duty
Thames Valley Police
South Central Ambulance Service
Thames Valley Air Ambulance
Berkshire Lowland Search and Rescue

References

External links

Royal Berkshire Fire and Rescue Service at HMICFRS

Organisations based in Berkshire
Fire and rescue services of England
Organisations based in England with royal patronage